John Collings may refer to:

John Collings (theologian)
John Collings (MP) for Derby

See also
John Collins (disambiguation)
John Collings-Wells, VC recipient